The Fire Is on the Bird is the first studio album by Australian hip hop band Jackson Jackson. It was issued on 27 March 2007 via EMI Music Australia with Jan Skubiszewski producing.

Release
The track "My Robot" was released exclusively to the iTunes Store. The untitled hidden track is absent on the iTunes Store.

Reception

At the ARIA Music Awards of 2007, The Fire Is on the Bird received a nomination for Best Urban Release.

Track listing

Personnel
See Jackson Jackson#Band members

References

2007 debut albums
Jackson Jackson albums
EMI Records albums